Antoine Yart (1710–1791) was a French poet and translator.

External links
 

1710 births
1791 deaths
18th-century French writers
18th-century French male writers
English–French translators
French translators
French male poets
French male non-fiction writers
18th-century French translators